Prievidza District is a district in the Trenčín Region of western Slovakia. Until 1918, the district was mostly part of the county of Kingdom of Hungary of Nyitra, apart from a small area in the south west around Handlová which formed part of the county of Bars.

Municipalities
Bojnice
Bystričany
Cigeľ
Čavoj
Čereňany
Diviacka Nová Ves
Diviaky nad Nitricou
Dlžín
Dolné Vestenice
Handlová
Horná Ves
Horné Vestenice
Chrenovec-Brusno
Chvojnica
Jalovec
Kamenec pod Vtáčnikom
Kanianka
Kľačno
Kocurany
Kostolná Ves
Koš
Lazany
Lehota pod Vtáčnikom
Liešťany
Lipník
Malá Čausa
Malinová
Nedožery-Brezany
Nevidzany
Nitrianske Pravno
Nitrianske Rudno
Nitrianske Sučany
Nitrica
Nováky
Opatovce nad Nitrou
Oslany
Podhradie
Poluvsie
Poruba
Pravenec
Prievidza
Radobica
Ráztočno
Rudnianska Lehota
Sebedražie
Seč
Šutovce
Temeš
Tužina
Valaská Belá
Veľká Čausa
Zemianske Kostoľany

Districts of Slovakia
Trenčín Region